Buick Century is the model name that was used by Buick for a line of upscale full-size cars from 1936 to 1942 and 1954 to 1958, as well as from 1973 to 2005 for mid-size cars.

The first Buick Century debuted as the Series 60 then renamed in 1936 as a shorter and lighter model featuring the same engine as the bigger Roadmaster and Limited series giving it more performance while using the shorter wheelbase body of the Buick Special. During the 1930s and 1940s it was Buick's companion to the top level Roadmaster and was offered as a 2-door and 4-door sedan and convertible. The Century name was used on six generations of cars of varying sizes as well as performance and trim levels. In 1969, Buick developed a concept car known as the Century Cruiser. In the 1970s, the Century Regal became a separate model and market positioning between the two products changed from year to year depending on sales. The Century was updated to front wheel drive in 1982 and was Buick's 2-door coupe, 4-door sedan and station wagon, with regular updates and feature upgrades as customer preferences changed over time.

Series 60 (1930–1935)

Originally, the Series 60 had the  OHV Buick Straight-6 engine from the Series 70, developing  at 2,800 rpm. It had, at the beginning of the generation, a full-length running board denoting the top model for Buick at the time, shared with the short wheelbase, entry level Series 40. In 1930, GM built 38,180 cars. The bodystyles available were torpedo, sedan, coupe, and roadster convertible, using GM's "B-body" platform. Starting with this generation, all GM cars shared a corporate appearance as a result of the "Art and Colour Section" headed by Harley J. Earl and modest yearly changes were introduced to freshen the appearance.

In 1931, the running board was reduced and the OHV  Buick Straight-8 engine was introduced that developed . Aesthetically, the Series 60 remained almost unchanged, and the same fact occurred also in the following year. In 1931 and 1932, a total of 55,135 were produced.

In 1933, the length of the body increased and the radiator was now concealed behind a façade with a grille. In 1934, the appearance was changed to a more rounded appearance, with a new OHV  eight-cylinder engine and 100 hp. In 1935, the model remained almost unchanged while the body style selections were similar to larger Buicks but more affordably priced. Six choices were available to include both 2- and 4-door convertibles using the term "phaeton" for the 4-door convertible with a listed price of US$1,675 ($ in  dollars ). Total production from 1933 to 1935 was 31,385. In 1936, the model changed its name to "Century".

First generation (1936–1942)

Buick renamed its entire model lineup for the 1936 model year to celebrate the engineering improvements and design advancements over their 1935 models, introducing a "streamlined" appearance. Buick's Series 40 model range became the Special, the Series 60 became the Century, the Series 80 became the Roadmaster, and the Series 90, Buick's longest and most luxurious vehicles, became the Limited. The terminology "Series 60" and "Series 70" were shared with Cadillac, while "Series 60", "Series 70", "Series 80" and "Series 90" were shared with Oldsmobile.

The basic formula for the 1936 to 1942 Century was established by mating the shorter wheelbase Special bodies to the Roadmaster's larger displacement straight-eight engine. The Century offered four different types of 2-door body styles to include convertibles and only one 4-door Sedan, with the ratio remaining coupes over sedans until 1938 when there were three coupe and three sedan choices. The 1940 Series 50 Super combined the longer Roadmaster body with the smaller displacement Special engine.

Prices listed for the 2-door Victoria Coupe started at US$1,055 ($ in  dollars ) to US$1,135 ($ in  dollars ) for the 2-door Convertible. By 1940 prices rose to US$1,175 ($ in  dollars ) for the Sport Coupe to US$1,620 ($ in  dollars ) for the 4-door Convertible Phaeton.

The Century was discontinued at the end of the abbreviated 1942 model year due to World War II, when production of passenger vehicles stopped on February 4, 1942, during which total model production only accounted for about 10% of Buick's total output.

Second generation (1954–1958)

Buick reintroduced the Century using the same formula of mating the smaller, lighter Buick Special body to its largest and most powerful  "Fireball" OHV V8 engine mated with a Dynaflow automatic transmission, with the intent of giving Buick a performance vehicle. Included in the model lineup during this period was a station wagon model, a body style that had been unavailable during the Century's first production period of 1936 until 1942. In 1953 The Buick-Berle Show introduced product placement commercials on TV, and later in 1955 The Honeymooners was one of the sponsors.

Introduced in the middle of the 1955 model year, the four-door Buick Century Riviera along with the four-door Special Riviera, the four-door Oldsmobile 98 Holiday, and four-door 88 Holiday, were the first four-door hardtops ever produced. For the first time, the Century was repositioned below the C-body Buick Super and priced lower. It continued to feature four "VentiPorts" on the front fenders like the larger Buick Roadmaster indicating its status equal to the Super, denoting it was a junior level Buick using the shorter B-body. It also introduced the "Panoramic" one-piece wrap around windshield on all GM cars for 1955.

In 1955, the California Highway Patrol placed a large fleet order for 270 Century two-door sedans, a body style unavailable to the general public. It combined the Special two-door sedan body shell with Century powertrain, of which 135 were Dynaflow automatics and 135 were manual transmissions. Broderick Crawford was shown driving a two-door Century sedan during the first season of his popular syndicated TV series Highway Patrol. These Century two-door sedans were actual police vehicles owned by the California Highway Patrol and were loaned to the TV production company, the CHP door emblems were changed to a generic highway patrol emblem. (In later seasons, he drove a four-door Century but these were not California Highway Patrol owned vehicles.) Power brakes were optional. Tubeless tires were new.

In 1956, the Century's base price was US$2,963 ($ in  dollars ). Power windows were standard in the convertible. A padded safety dash became optional.

For 1957, Buick styling was notable for its three-piece rear window design. This was a feature in all series fixed-roof body-styles, (excluding wagons and convertibles). Oldsmobile also used this 3-piece rear window design that year, marketed as the “Twin-Strutted Rear Window.”

Because the Century was considered the senior "small Buick", the model received a version of GM's hardtop station wagon, the Century Caballero Estate for the 1957 and 1958 model years and was not continued for 1959.

For 1959, Buick renamed the Century the Invicta.

Third generation (1973–1977)

The Buick Century nameplate was revived for the 1973 model year on the rear-wheel drive intermediate A-body platform, which was redesigned for this year. The name replaced Skylark for Buick's mid-sized cars. The Century Regal coupe was added at the top of the model range and later became a separate series, dropping the Century name for 1976. It was available with two- and four-barrel versions of the Buick 350, putting out , respectively. The  455 was also an option. The base Century and Century 350 coupes had a fastback roof with large rear quarter glass, while the Century Luxus featured a more formal notchback roofline with narrow opera windows. The Century Estate replaced the Buick Sport Wagon.

By replacing the Skylark, the Century inherited the Gran Sport performance option. The package was available with any engine and included upgraded suspension, additional instrumentation, and unique appearance treatment. A Saginaw three-speed manual was standard with either 350 engine. A Muncie M-21 four-speed was available with either 350 or with the regular 455, while the Stage I required a Turbo-Hydramatic 400.

The 1974 Buick Century and Regal were introduced with HEI (High-Energy Ignition systems) instead of points and ignition coil. The 1974 Buick Century Gran Sport was still, "Available only as a Hardtop Colonnade Coupe, it carries the Rallye ride and handling suspension with stabilizer bars, front and rear. Plus a specialized blacked-out grille and head lamp doors, an accent stripe on the rear deck, special tail lamps and Gran Sport grille ornamentation. And if you go for the Gran Sport, you can add the Stage 1, the high performance engine."

For 1975, the Luxus was renamed Century Custom. The new  231 V6 was installed as standard equipment along with a three-speed manual transmission on coupes and sedans, and the big-block 455 was no longer available. The four-barrel 350 V8 became standard on station wagons. A new landau top became available for fastback coupes that partially covered the rear quarter glass, giving an appearance similar to the formal-roof Century Custom. A Century Special coupe was added to the lineup, using the fastback roofline. The Special was marketed as an economy variant of the Century and was only available with the V6 engine.

In 1975, the US government legalized rectangular headlights and Buick added them to the Century for the 1976 model year, positioned side-by-side on coupes, and stacked vertically on sedans. Sedans received a taller, more-formal grille, while coupes got an angled, body-colored front end along with new bodyside sheet metal that lacked the traditional "sweepspear". The Gran Sport option was discontinued with the 455 engines and only 231 V6 or 350 V8 were available on the last 1,288 made vehicles merely with appearance and suspension option package.

To commemorate the Bicentennial of the United States, the standard colors available on all Buicks were Judicial Black, Liberty White, Pewter Gray, Potomac Blue, Continental Blue, Concord Green, Constitution Green, Mount Vernon Cream, Buckskin Tan, Musket Brown, Boston Red and Independence Red, with specially available colors on select models Congressional Cream, Revere Red, Colonial Yellow and Firecracker Orange.

In 1977, the V6 engine was revised to be even-firing, and a  Oldsmobile V8 was added as an option for station wagons.

Buick Centuries were used in the 1975 and 1976 Indianapolis Motor Speedway as pace cars. Buick introduced a 1975 Buick Century "Free Spirit" edition replica based on the Indy Pace Car for the public with patriotic graphic decals and the Buick Hawk on the hood. This 1975 vehicle had a transmission shifter on the floor with bucket seats and "Hurst Hatch" T-tops installed. The white exterior and blue/white interior were based on the 1975 two-door sheet metal. The engine was a 350 V8, as opposed to the 455 V8 used on the actual Indy 500 Pace Car. Alternatively, in 1976, Buick introduced the "Free Spirit" edition of the Indy Pace Car; it was downsized to the 1976 Special facelift sheet metal with a 231 V6. The original Indy Pace Car had the turbocharged 231 V6. The replica featured a silver, black, and red paint with a black interior. The vehicle included a positive-traction differential.

Production Figures:

Fourth generation (1978–1981)

The Century was initially offered as an "aeroback" fastback two-door coupe and a fastback four-door sedan along with a station wagon model (sharing bodies with the Oldsmobile Cutlass Salon). The car was over a foot shorter, several inches narrower, and several hundred pounds lighter than its predecessor. Big-block engines were discontinued and the new base powerplant was Buick's new  V6 introduced specifically for the Century and Regal. The  V6 and the Chevrolet 305 V8 were options. The Pontiac  and  replaced the Chevrolet engine for 1979.

One of the more rare models of this time was the 1979 to 1980 Century Turbo Coupe, powered by a turbocharged version of the 3.8 L V6, which offered V8-like performance with more reasonable fuel consumption and reduced emissions. The Turbo Coupe was not nearly as popular as the similar Regal Turbo Sport Coupe of the time, and total production is estimated to be less than 2,500.

The two fastback models (along with the Oldsmobile Cutlass Salon) proved unpopular. For 1980, the fastback four-door sedan was dropped in favor of a conventional notchback four-door sedan. After 1980, the Century fastback coupe was discontinued. With the introduction of the new front-wheel drive Century in 1982, the existing notchback sedan and wagon models were transferred to the Regal line.

Production Figures:

Fifth generation (1982–1996)

In January 1982, GM debuted the downsized fifth generation Century, using the front-wheel drive A platform, in coupe and sedan forms. 

The fifth generation Century shared the front-wheel drive A platform with the Cutlass Ciera, Pontiac 6000 and Chevrolet Celebrity, and together the A-bodies became enormously popular — as well as synonymous with GM's most transparent examples of badge engineering, highlighted almost indistinguishably on the August 22, 1983 cover of Forbes magazine as examples of genericized uniformity, embarrassing the company and ultimately prompting GM to recommit to design leadership.

 

In October 1983, a station wagon was added to the lineup to replace the discontinued Regal wagon. The 1984 model year also had an Olympic version of the Buick Century, commemorating the 1984 games in Los Angeles, California. In 1985, all 1986 versions were "freshened" with a new, more angular front fascia. Both four-cylinder gasoline units and diesel V6 engines were offered in this generation, although neither became popular. Performance versions of several Buick models, including the Century coupe, were marketed in the mid-1980s under the T-Type name. With Buick's 181 cu in (3.0 L) V6 producing , the Century T-Type's performance was modest, but the Buick 3.8 V6 SFI engine, producing , offered performance in this comparatively lightweight vehicle.

For 1985 and 1986, Hess & Eisenhardt/Car Craft of Lima, Ohio converted 124 finished Buick Century coupes into coachbuilt convertibles. Although these convertibles were sold as new cars through Buick dealerships, these conversions were not factory authorized. In 1986, the engine distributor was replaced by a coil-pack ignition system that proved to be far more reliable than the system that it replaced. The "Chevrolet Century" were sold in South America and the Caribbean. In Mexico, it was sold as the Century Limited (with no brand, although it wears the Buick logos). Introduced for 1984, it was the top model for General Motors Mexico, and it survived the import car wave from 1991 (previously new car importations were forbidden in Mexico) and continued in production until the 1996 model year. In Japan it was sold as the Buick Regal because of the Toyota Century limousine.

The Century received a facelift in late 1988 for the 1989 model year, gaining a new more-rounded roofline, but continuing on the A-body platform. Black plastic inserts with the Buick tri-shield emblem replaced the rear quarter windows. The front end received flush headlamps and a rounded grille, and the stand-up hood ornament was now standard. All sedan models were easily distinguished by their full-width taillights that followed a Buick tradition of big taillights. The 3300 was introduced in 1989 as a replacement for the 3800 cc engine, offering an increase of 10 horsepower, but a loss of 15 lb-ft of torque. The smaller engine featured multiport fuel injection, waste spark distributor-less ignition controlled by the ECM after startup, but had no balance shaft. An interior refresh came in 1989 for 1990 models.

The 1989 model had seatbelts mounted on the b-pillar, for 1990-1996 the seatbelts were mounted on the door. From 1989-1992, the Century had a black bumper and side trim, and from 1993-1996 the Century had a bodycolored trim.

1991 facelift
For the 1991 model year, the Century received another slight facelift featuring a bigger radiator grille and different headlamps. The interior featured new door panels with the window switches and door lock switches relocated to a more convenient configuration found on more modern cars, where the switch location corresponds with the window location in the car body. This feature never appeared on its sibling the Oldsmobile Ciera, which retained the inline switch bank mounted flush with the door panel, the rear switch being the driver's door window. The Century windows switches were not backlit, but illuminated by a small bulb in the door panel trim above the switch bank. Other interior changes included new seat covers, and relocating the front outboard seat belts from the A-pillar into the door, functioning as "automatic" seat belts so that the belts could be buckled and the door opened and closed while still buckled. The driver and front passenger could enter and exit the vehicle while the seat belt was still fastened.

For 1993, the 2.5 L I4 was replaced with a new 115 hp 2.2 I4. For 1994, the slow-selling coupe model was dropped (603 sold for 1993, or 0.5% of overall Century sales), and all models received a standard driver's-side airbag. Midway through the 1994 model year, a round speedometer replaced the wide rectangular one, but the car still carried on with the original dash.

Despite its dated design, the Century and its sibling the Oldsmobile Cutlass Ciera still sold well during the 1990s and proved both reliable and profitable to GM since their tooling costs had been monetized.

Production

Engines

Sixth generation (1997–2005)

The Century was redesigned for the last time in December 1996. The four-door sedan was the only body style offered (the station wagon was dropped due to decreasing sales) and was still a front-wheel drive, V6-powered configuration. Plainer "Custom" and fancier "Limited" trim levels were carried over from the previous generation. The redesign moved Centurys to the W-body platform, rejoining its former Regal sibling. In this generation, the Century and Regal were nearly the same cars, distinguished only by seating configurations, trim, and engine differences. Since the Century was lower-priced than the Regal, it was also the lower-powered and plainer of the two, offering only a 3.1-liter V6. In keeping with its traditional image, the six-passenger Century came equipped with a front bench seat and column shifter, while the more performance-oriented five-passenger Regal came standard with front bucket seats and a console shifter.

After the 1998 discontinuation of the Skylark, the Century became Buick's entry-level car for the first time. For 2003, all trim levels were eliminated, leaving one standard model. Additionally, the "Century" nameplate on the front doors was dropped, and only seen on the vehicle's taillights.

Changes were relatively few over the Century's nine-year run. The all-new Buick LaCrosse replaced both the Century and Regal. A limited run of Centurys with special trim were produced for 2005 to mark the end of the name. GM rolled the last Buick Century off the Oshawa assembly line on October 25, 2004.

China 

The Buick Century was produced in China as the New Century from 1998 to 2000. The engine was the 3.0 liter LW9 V6 engine which was also used in the first-generation Buick GL8. A four-cylinder model was also available paired with a 5-speed manual gearbox. The Century was replaced by the Buick Regal due to poor sales.

After the discontinuation of the model in 2000, the New Century name was used as a trim level of the Buick Regal, sold until at least 2005.

Engines
 1997–1999 L82  V6 , 
 2000–2005 LG8  V6 ,

Usage of the name in China (2023) 

In China, the fourth generation Buick GL8 minivan was marketed as the Buick GL8 Century.

References

External links

A-body.net - 82-96 GM A-body Website & Forum

Century
Coupés
Front-wheel-drive vehicles
Full-size vehicles
Mid-size cars
Rear-wheel-drive vehicles
Sedans
Station wagons
1930s cars
1940s cars
1950s cars
1970s cars
1980s cars
1990s cars
2000s cars
Cars introduced in 1936
Motor vehicles manufactured in the United States
Cars of Canada
Kojak